BK Jēkabpils is a professional basketball club based in Jēkabpils, Latvia, playing in the Latvian Basketball League and Baltic Basketball League. It was founded in 2012 and since then the club is playing in LBL higher division. The club's home arena is the Jēkabpils Sporta nams.

In its first season the club entered the Latvian Basketball League playoff quarterfinals, which they lost to Barons kvartāls team. Already in the next 2013–2014th season the club had even greater success with their coach Igors Miglinieks to win LBL bronze medals. In their third season Jēkabpils outplayed Liepāja/Triobet and the second year in a row obtained LBL bronze.

Roster

Season by season

Coaches
 Edgars Teteris (2012–2014)
 Igors Miglinieks (2014)
 Edmunds Valeiko (2014–2015)
 Igors Miglinieks (2015–2016)
 Rūdolfs Rozītis (2016–2017)
 Sandis Buškevics (2017–2018)
 Marko Zarkovič (2018–2019)
 Agris Galvanovskis (2019–2021)
 Artūrs Brūniņš (2021–present)

Notable players
 Aigars Vītols
 Michal Hlebowicki
 Rinalds Sirsniņš
 Mārtiņš Kravčenko
 Pāvels Veselovs
 Andrejs Šeļakovs
 Povilas Čukinas
 Rihards Kuksiks
 Dovydas Redikas
 Jurijs Aleksejevs

References

External links
Official website 

Jēkabpils
Basketball teams in Latvia